Arthritis Australia is a charitable not-for-profit organisation advocating for people with arthritis and musculoskeletal conditions.

Arthritis Australia awards nearly $1 million in annual funding to researchers engaged in basic and clinical research that aims to further knowledge of arthritis and develop treatments and cures. Grant recipients are mostly early or mid-career scientists and clinicians. One-year fellowships, project grants and scholarships are also offered.

In 2012, Arthritis Australia partnered with the Bupa Health Foundation to create MyJointPain.org.au. The website creates a tailored management plan for people living with chronic joint pain from osteoarthritis and provides comprehensive information to help them manage their condition and improve their mobility.

Ease of use packaging
Arthritis Australia established the Ease of Use program to help industries fix issues with hard-to-open packaging. The scheme has tested more than 200 products, including products from Nestlé, Woolworths, Kellogg's and SPC Ardmona.

Packaging accessibility has become an issue due to two trends: an ageing population with reduced strength and functional limitations, and an increase in "packaging rage" or "wrap rage" – the coined terms for the anger consumers feel when they can't open packaging. Data from a 2013 Catalyst Research survey showed that one in two Australians have injured themselves opening packaging. Of those, 42% of people suffered a deep cut they treated at home when trying to open packaging.

To assist the packaging industry with these trends, Arthritis Australia developed a variety of tests to assist retailers and manufacturers. One of these tests, the Initial Scientific Review (ISR), was developed as part of a consortium that included Nestlé, NSW Health and Georgia Tech. The ISR report evaluates packaging for ease of opening and accessibility, as well as providing a score based on the Accessibility Benchmarking Scale (ABS). The ABS score estimates the percentage of the population that can open the packaging and allows organisations to compare suppliers. For hospitals, the ISR allows them to work with manufacturers to make modifications to packaging as recommended on the ISR and improve packaging accessibility for hospital patients.

History

Arthritis Australia, originally named the Australian Rheumatism Council, held its inaugural meeting on 25 May 1949. Its objectives were to:
 Institute research into causes and means of alleviation of any form of rheumatic condition
 To establish special facilities for the treatment of rheumatic conditions
 To endow chairs at appropriate university medical schools
 To communicate knowledge as to the methods of prevention, alleviation and cure of rheumatic conditions.

In 1968 the name was changed to Australian Arthritis and Rheumatism Foundation and in 1984 the foundation incorporated in New South Wales and became the Arthritis Foundation of Australia.

From 1948 through the 1950s, individual physicians who were interested in the management of rheumatic conditions were at disadvantage as there were few facilities at the teaching hospitals. There was also widespread ignorance among the general public as to what could be done for people with arthritis. In 1960 the foundation received a bequest that made it possible for funds to be directed towards facilitating the training of young physicians in the special skills required to treat people with arthritis.

From 1967 to 1982, each state developed an independent arthritis organisation with aims focused on the treatment and rehabilitation facilities in each state. Each state/territory offices operates as an autonomous organisation and all state and territory offices except for Arthritis Victoria are affiliated with Arthritis Australia. Today, the Arthritis Australia state affiliates focus on education for health consumers and health professionals, support the National Arthritis Infoline, distribute information sheets and booklets and run community seminars

References

External links
 

Arthritis organizations
Medical and health organisations based in New South Wales
Health charities in Australia
1949 establishments in Australia
Organizations established in 1949